Chura loenpa is a Tibetan cheese important within the cuisine of Tibet. It is a soft cheese, similar to cottage cheese, made from the curds that are left over from boiling buttermilk.

See also
 Chura kampo (dried Tibetan cheese)
 List of cheeses
 List of Tibetan dishes
 Tibetan culture

References
Dorje, Rinjing (1985) Food in Tibetan Life, Banyan Press, page 96

External links
Allen, Bryan and Silvia, Kaas maken en Bai-cultuur Tibetan cheese 

Tibetan cuisine
Tibetan cheeses
Mixed-milk cheeses